Sasso means stone in Italian. Notable people with the surname include:
Ana Sasso (born c.1963), Croatian former beauty pageant contestant and model
Cinzia Sasso (born 1956), Italian journalist
Guidina Dal Sasso (born 1958), Italian cross country skier
John Sasso, American Democratic political operative
Kiara Sasso (born 1979), Brazilian actress and singer
Sandy Eisenberg Sasso (born 1947), American rabbi
Vincent Sasso (born 1991), French football player
Will Sasso (born 1975), Canadian actor

Places named Sasso
Gran Sasso d'Italia, mountain in the Abruzzo region of central Italy
Sasso Marconi, town and comune of the province of Bologna in northern Italy
Monte Sasso, mountain in Lombardy, Italy
Sasso di Bordighera, village in Liguria, Italy

See also
Madonna del Sasso (disambiguation)
Gran Sasso (disambiguation)
SASO (disambiguation)

Italian-language surnames